Excelsior is a community incorporated within the city of War in McDowell County, West Virginia. Excelsior is located along Dry Fork to the north of the city along West Virginia Route 16.

Geography of McDowell County, West Virginia
Neighborhoods in West Virginia